"Zip-Lock" is a song by the American pop punk band Lit, released as the follow-up single to their number one rock hit "My Own Worst Enemy" from their second album, A Place in the Sun in 1999. While not as successful as its previous single, it was able to reach number 11 on the Modern Rock Tracks and number 34 on the Mainstream Rock Tracks.

Track listing
Europe CD maxi-single
"Zip-Lock" (Radio Version) — 3:31
"Zip-Lock" (Album Version) — 3:32
"Quicksand" — 3:18

Music video
Directed by Chris Applebaum, the video starts out with an homage to the opening of Twisted Sister's "We're Not Gonna Take It". Dee Snider, the lead singer of Twisted Sister, plays the role of the angry father (originally portrayed by Mark Metcalf) who verbally abuses his son for his lack of authority and uncleanliness. After the father leaves, the son throws a pool party for his friends, and as hijinks ensue, they're intercut with shots of the band playing. The video features synchronized swimming and an appearance by a girl in a yellow one piece bathing suit lounging on a red pool float that resembles the album cover of A Place in the Sun. The video ends with the band leaving in a limosine. Mark Hoppus, Travis Barker and Tom Delonge of Blink-182 have a cameo as naked partygoers, continuing the streaking from their video "What's My Age Again?"

In popular culture
The song is featured in the first season of comedy sitcom Malcolm in the Middle, in the episode Francis Escapes, during a montage of Francis (played by Christopher Masterson), running away from military school to visit his long distance girlfriend.
The song is featured in the opening of the 2000 sports film The Replacements, where Shane Falco (played by Keanu Reeves), is playing football underwater.
The song is featured in the October 10th 1999 episode of WWE's Sunday Night Heat, with the music video cut together with clips from the past week of WWE.
Pop punk band The Wonder Years covered “Zip Lock” for a split EP with Fallen From The Sky called “Under The Influence” in 2010. The vinyl release artwork features a parody of Lit’s “A Place In The Sun” artwork with a Captain Crunch caricature in place of the bikini girl on Lit’s record. This is a nod to The Wonder Years song “Bout To Get Fruit Punched, Homie” from their album “Get Stoked On It”

Charts

References

External links

1998 songs
1999 singles
RCA Records singles
Music videos directed by Chris Applebaum
Lit (band) songs